The 1836 United States presidential election in New Jersey took place between November 3 and December 7, 1836, as part of the 1836 United States presidential election. Voters chose eight representatives, or electors to the Electoral College, who voted for President and Vice President.

New Jersey voted for the Whig candidate, William Henry Harrison, over Democratic candidate Martin Van Buren. Harrison won New Jersey by a margin of 1.06%.

Results

See also
 United States presidential elections in New Jersey

References

New Jersey
1836
1836 New Jersey elections